Captain Robert Edward Dudley Ryder  (16 February 1908 – 29 June 1986) was a Royal Navy officer and a British recipient of the Victoria Cross, the highest award for gallantry in the face of the enemy that can be awarded to British and Commonwealth forces. He became a Conservative Member of Parliament after retiring from the navy.

Early life
Ryder was born in India in 1908 to Colonel Charles Henry Dudley Ryder, Surveyor General of India, and Ida Josephine Grigg. He was a great-grandson of the Right Reverend Henry Ryder, youngest son of Nathaniel Ryder, 1st Baron Harrowby. Ryder had two brothers; both were killed in the Second World War. Lisle Charles Dudley Ryder was killed in the Le Paradis massacre of 1940 in France. Ernle Terrick Dudley Ryder died in captivity after the defence of Singapore. Ryder was educated at Hazelhurst School and Cheltenham College before he entered the Royal Navy in 1926.

Naval career
Ryder served on several ships throughout his career. He served as a midshipman on the battleship  from 1927 to 1929. As a lieutenant he served in the submarine  as part of the 4th Flotilla in China from 1930 to 1933. Ryder also commanded several expeditions. This included captaining the ketch Tai-Mo-Shan on a 16,217 mile voyage from Hong Kong to Dartmouth, England during 1933–1934. From 1934 to 1937 he captained the schooner Penola during the British Graham Land Expedition in Antarctica.

In 1940, he was promoted to commander of the Q-ship  which was sunk by a torpedo in the Atlantic, 200 miles west of Ireland; Ryder was adrift for four days before rescue. Appointed commander of the sloop . In early 1941, he went on to captain the Prince Philippe a cross-channel steamer converted to a Commando ship, which sank after a collision in the Firth of Clyde. Ryder, now a commander, led the St Nazaire Raid, codenamed Operation Chariot, on 28 March 1942. This was a successful operation to destroy the "Normandie Dock" in the German naval base in the town. The stated aim of the operation was to deny large German ships, particularly the German battleship Tirpitz, a base on the Atlantic coast. For his actions during this operation he was one of five people awarded the Victoria Cross, the highest award for valour of the British Empire.

Victoria Cross
The official citation:

His medal is held by the Imperial War Museum, London.

Later naval career
Ryder took part in the Allied attack on the German-occupied port of Dieppe, Seine-Inférieure on the northern coast of France on 19 August 1942. The Dieppe Raid was largely a failure, but it helped influence planning for Operation Overlord, the landings on D-Day. Ryder achieved a final rank of captain in 1948 and later served as naval attaché in Oslo.

Later life
Following his naval career, he stood for election to the House of Commons as the Conservative Party candidate for Merton and Morden at the 1950 general election. He was elected and served as the Member of Parliament for five years. He died on 29 June 1986, whilst on the yacht Watchdog during a sailing trip to France. He is buried in Headington Crematorium, Oxford.

Awards
 Victoria Cross; gazetted 19 May 1942
 Légion d'honneur
 Croix de guerre
 3 Mentions in despatches:
 2 October 1942
 10 November 1944
 15 December 1944
 Polar Medal with clasp

References

General
 British VCs of World War 2 (John Laffin, 1997)
 Monuments To Courage (David Harvey, 1999)
 The Register of the Victoria Cross (This England, 1997)
 E.J. Ryder, Antoni Chmielowski

Further reading
 Hopton, Richard. Reluctant Hero: The Life of Captain Robert Ryder VC.

External links
 
 Robert RYDER of Cheltenham College
 Location of grave and VC medal (Oxfordshire)
 HMS Campbeltown and the Raid on St. Nazaire (detailed description of the action)
 The St. Nazaire Society (Operation Chariot)

1908 births
1986 deaths
British naval attachés
People educated at Cheltenham College
Royal Navy recipients of the Victoria Cross
Recipients of the Polar Medal
Royal Navy officers
Royal Navy officers of World War II
Conservative Party (UK) MPs for English constituencies
UK MPs 1950–1951
UK MPs 1951–1955
British World War II recipients of the Victoria Cross
Chevaliers of the Légion d'honneur
Robert
Recipients of the Croix de Guerre 1939–1945 (France)
Military personnel of British India